Edmund Giemza (Giemza) (16 October 1912 – 30 September 1994) was a Polish interwar soccer player. He was born on 16 October 1912 in Upper Silesian city of Ruda Śląska and died on 30 September 1994 in Chinnor, England.

Giemsa played for Ruch Chorzów as well as Polish National Team.  With Ruch, he was a multiple champion of Poland (1933, 1934, 1935, 1936, 1938).

On 4 June 1933 in Warsaw he debuted in Polish National Team (Poland - Belgium 0-1). Altogether he played in 9 international games, without scoring any goals.  He was in Polish Roster in World Cup France 1938, but did not appear on the field in the legendary game Poland - Brazil 5-6 (5 June 1938, Strasbourg, France). His last game, in a white-red jersey, was on 27 August 1939 in Warsaw (Poland - Hungary 4-2).

Edmund Giemsa is Great-Grandfather to Ethan Giemza and Grandfather to Stefan Giemza.

During World War II he was forced to join the Wehrmacht but deserted and joined the French Resistance from where he joined the Polish Army. After the war Giemsa decided to stay in the United Kingdom and did not return to Poland.

See also
 Polish Roster in World Cup Soccer France 1938

References

1912 births
1994 deaths
Polish footballers
Poland international footballers
Association football defenders
Ruch Chorzów players
1938 FIFA World Cup players
Sportspeople from Ruda Śląska
People from the Province of Silesia
German Army personnel of World War II
French Resistance members
Deserters